Haan station is a through station in the town of Haan in the German state of North Rhine-Westphalia. It has two platform tracks and it is classified by Deutsche Bahn as a category 5 station.

History

The station was opened in 1885 on the Gruiten–Köln-Deutz railway, which was completed between Gruiten and Opladen by the Bergisch-Märkische Railway Company on 25 September 1867. The station building, which is a replica of a station in Massachusetts, was finished in 1899. Since 26 May 1993, it has been heritage-listed. Until the 1980s, there was a freight yard located at the present site of the construction market in Böttingerstraße. In 2007, the station surroundings were redesigned and bicycle parking and additional car parking were built.

Transport services

The station is served by the Rhein-Wupper-Bahn (RB 48) between Wuppertal-Oberbarmen and Cologne twice an hour during the day, with one train an hour to/from Bonn-Mehlem.

It is also served by four bus routes operated by Rheinbahn: O1 (every 20–40 minutes), 784 (20), 786 (20–60) and 792 (20–60).

References

Railway stations in North Rhine-Westphalia
Railway stations in Germany opened in 1885
Buildings and structures in Mettmann (district)